Statue of Robert the Bruce may refer to:
 Equestrian statue of Robert the Bruce, Bannockburn, Stirling, Scotland
 Statue of Robert the Bruce, Stirling Castle, Stirling, Scotland

See also
 Cultural depictions of Robert the Bruce